Mairie d'Issy is the southern terminus of Line 12 of the Paris Métro in the commune of Issy-les-Moulineaux. It is named after and located near the town hall; shops located on the Avenue Victor Cresson and Avenue de la République are served by the station. It was opened on 24 March 1934 as part of the extension of the line from Porte de Versailles.

Station layout

Gallery

References
Roland, Gérard (2003). Stations de métro. D’Abbesses à Wagram. Éditions Bonneton.

Paris Métro stations in Issy-les-Moulineaux
Railway stations in France opened in 1934